The Loneliness of the Crocodile is a German satiric crime film directed and produced by Jobst Oetzmann, based on a novel by . The director's first film for the cinema, it was filmed in 1999 and presented in 2000. It was a German contribution at the Cannes Film Festival, and was awarded the Bayerischer Filmpreis.

Plot 
Günther, the strictly raised son of a village butcher, becomes an outcast (Außenseiter) because his crazy ideas challenge the local community. He desires to escape his narrow surroundings, but ends up in a psychiatric clinic. Back in the care of his parents, he dies, allegedly by suicide. Elias, who trains to be a journalist, becomes intrigued in investigating this strange story of a lost life, and through it finds himself.

History 
It was the German contribution at the Cannes Film Festival, and was also presented at the Forum du Cinéma Européen in Strasbourg. The film received its U.S. premiere at the 2001 Brooklyn Film Festival, and appeared also at the Hong Kong Film Festival, and at the Mill Valley Film Festival in California.

Awards 
 2000: Bayerischer Filmpreis for the producer
 2001: Preis der deutschen Filmkritik for the music

References

External links 
 
 Die Einsamkeit der Krokodile Filmportal
 Jörg Machi: Die Einsamkeit der Krokodile filmrezension.de
 jobst-oetzmann.de Chronologie zur internationalen Rezeption des Films (retrieved 7 November 2015)

2000 films
German crime comedy-drama films
2000s German films